Subanen (also spelled Subanon or Subanun) can refer to:

 Subanen language
 Subanen people